The Osaka International, formerly Osaka Satellite, is an international badminton tournament held in Osaka, Japan, established in 2007, and has been an International Challenge level tournament.

Previous winners

Performances by nation

References

External links
 Ōsaka International Challenge Badminton senshuken (Japanese)

Sports competitions in Japan
Badminton tournaments in Japan